Nivolumab/relatlimab, sold under the brand name Opdualag, is a fixed-dose combination medication use to treat melanoma. It contains nivolumab, a programmed death receptor-1 (PD-1) blocking antibody, and relatlimab, a lymphocyte activation gene-3 (LAG-3) blocking antibody. It is given by intravenous infusion.

The combination was approved for medical use in the United States in March 2022, and in the European Union in September 2022. The US Food and Drug Administration (FDA) considers it to be a first-in-class medication.

Medical uses 
The combination is indicated for the first line treatment of advanced (unresectable or metastatic) melanoma in people aged twelve years of age and older.

Society and culture

Legal status 
On 21 July 2022, the Committee for Medicinal Products for Human Use (CHMP) of the European Medicines Agency (EMA) adopted a positive opinion, recommending the granting of a marketing authorization for the medicinal product Opdualag, intended for the treatment of melanoma. The applicant for this medicinal product is Bristol-Myers Squibb Pharma EEIG. Opdualag was approved for medical use in the European Union in September 2022.

References

Further reading

External links 
 
 
 

Antineoplastic drugs
Bristol Myers Squibb
Combination drugs
Monoclonal antibodies for tumors